The Emporis Skyscraper Award was an award for architectural excellence regarding the design of buildings and their functionality.

The award was presented annually by Emporis, a real estate data mining company with headquarters in Hamburg, Germany. The award is given to the building representing the "Best new skyscraper for design and functionality". To qualify, nominated buildings must have been completed during the year of the award, and must be at least 100 meters in height. Nominees and winners were chosen by Emporis editors, and the award would have been announced the following January and is usually presented at the following spring or summer. Prior to 2000, the award was known as the Skyscrapers.com Award.

Winners of the Emporis Skyscraper Award

See also 
Emporis
List of architecture prizes

References

External links 
Emporis Awards Official Site

Architecture awards
Skyscrapers
Year of establishment missing